Jacqueline Barnathan is the executive editor of CBS Newspath and an Emmy-award winning senior producer at CBS News. She has worked at both CBS Evening News and the CBS Early Show. In 1994, she was first deputy press secretary for New York City Mayor Rudolph Giuliani.

Career
Immediately prior to working at CBS News, Barnathan produced the 5 p.m., 6 p.m. and 11 p.m. broadcasts for WCBS-TV in New York City.

During her early days in television, she worked at ABC News in Washington on Nightline, World News Tonight, This Week with David  Brinkley and Good Morning America. She also spent time at Fox Television station WNYW in New York City. She won an Emmy award for contributions to the reporting of the momentous events beginning on September 11, 2001. In 2004, she won Emmy an award nomination for outstanding coverage of the capture of Saddam Hussein on the CBS Evening News Weekend Edition; and in 2006 she was again nominated for an Emmy for her work with CBS Evening News on "The Election of the Pope".

Personal life
Her father, Julius Barnathan, was president of broadcast operations at ABC. She graduated from American University in 1986 where she was general manager of the campus television station.

Barnathan lives in New York with her husband Ken Marlin and their daughter.

References

News & Documentary Emmy Award winners
American University alumni
Place of birth missing (living people)
Year of birth missing (living people)
American television news producers
ABC News
CBS News people
Living people